Island collared dove has been split into two species:
 Sunda collared dove, Streptopelia bitorquata
 Philippine collared dove, Streptopelia dusumieri

Birds by common name